The Inner Ring Road is a ring road freeway in the city of Vijayawada in the Indian state of Andhra Pradesh.

Route 

The route of the road starts at Gollapudi Y–junction of Krishna district and terminates at Ramavarappadu ring, connecting National Highway 16 and National Highway 65.

References 

Roads in Vijayawada
Ring roads in India
Buildings and structures in Vijayawada
Bridges and flyovers in Vijayawada